The 2013–14 season was Stevenage F.C.'s fourth season in the Football League, where the club competed in League One. This article shows statistics of the club's players in the season, and also lists all matches that the club played in the season. Their 18th-place finish during the 2012–13 campaign meant it would be Stevenage's third season of playing in League One, having only spent three years as a Football League club.

Squad details
Last updated on 3 August 2013.

Players information

Management
Manager: Graham Westley
Assistant manager: Dino Maamria
Coach: Jason Goodliffe

Match results

Legend

Pre-season
In June 2013, Stevenage announced that their pre-season campaign would consist of five friendlies to prepare for the 2013–14 season. Two days later, on 20 June, slight amendments were made to the list, with the club facing Championship side Watford at Broadhall Way on 20 July, instead of a trip to Chelmsford City as originally scheduled. One further fixture was added in early July, with a Manchester United XI visiting Broadhall Way on 26 July. Ahead of the pre-season campaign, the team travelled to La Manga in Spain to take part in a four-day training camp.

The club opened the pre-season schedule with a behind-closed-doors friendly against newly promoted League Two side Mansfield Town, winning 5–2 courtesy of goals from Filipe Morais, Dani López, Robin Shroot and a brace from Roarie Deacon. Two days later, Stevenage travelled to another newly promoted team, this time Biggleswade Town of the Southern League Premier Division. The game ended 6–0 in Stevenage's favour, with strikers Oumare Tounkara and Dani López both scoring two apiece, and midfielders Luke Freeman and Matt Ball also netting. The club's first home fixture of pre-season took place on 16 July, entertaining a Queens Park Rangers XI at Broadhall Way. Stevenage won the match 2–0 courtesy of first-half goals from Greg Tansey and Luke Freeman. Back-to-back home defeats to Championship opposition followed. Stevenage's first defeat of pre-season came courtesy of a 2–0 loss to Watford, before a Luke Varney hat-trick gave Leeds United a 3–0 win at Broadhall Way three days later. Three days after the defeat to Leeds, on 26 July, Stevenage entertained a Manchester United XI, with the game ending 2–2 – both of Stevenage's goals coming from Darius Charles after the hosts had trailed by two goals. A day later, the club's pre-season schedule concluded with a 5–0 win at Hitchin Town, with goals coming from Roarie Deacon, Robin Shroot and a Dani López hat-trick.

 Note: Stevenage goals come first.

League One

The 2013–14 League One fixtures were released on 19 June 2013, with Stevenage opening their league campaign at home to Oldham Athletic on 3 August 2013. This meant it was the fifth straight season that Stevenage had opened their campaign with a home fixture. The game ended 4–3 in Oldham's favour, with six of the seven goals coming in the second-half. Stevenage's Darius Charles gave the home side the lead just before half-time, firing in from close range after Luke Jones' header had rebounded back off the post. The visitors then scored three unanswered times after the interval. The first came courtesy of a James Tarkowski volley from Jose Baxter's inswinging free-kick. Baxter then gave Oldham the lead from the penalty spot, before Cristian Montaño ran the length of the pitch to double their advantage. Stevenage fought back with two goals in seven minutes; new signing Oumare Tounkara squared the ball for Greg Tansey to finish from six yards out, and then Filipe Morais levelled after beating the offside trap following Tansey's floated free-kick. With just three minutes remaining, Baxter scored his second goal from the penalty spot after Charles was adjudged to have handled the ball when blocking Charlie MacDonald's shot, with the goal ensuring the three points went the way of the visitors. A second league defeat followed a week later, with the club losing 1–0 to Swindon Town at the County Ground, courtesy of Massimo Luongo's 25-yard first-half strike. A week later, Stevenage fell to their third consecutive league defeat, a 1–0 home defeat to Leyton Orient, with a Kevin Lisbie header settling the match in the first-half. Following three successive league defeats by a one-goal margin, Stevenage secured their first league win of the season on 24 August, winning 1–0 away at Notts County. The only goal of the game came in injury-time, with James Dunne firing home following good work from Robin Shroot down the left wing. A 1–1 home draw against Bradford City was Stevenage's last game in August. Greg Tansey gave Stevenage the lead from the penalty spot midway through the first-half. Bradford equalised three minutes after the interval through Kyel Reid's curling free kick.

Stevenage made it three unbeaten when they drew 0–0 away at Tranmere Rovers on 7 September. The run came to an end the following week when the club fell to a 3–0 defeat to Preston North End at Deepdale. In what was Graham Westley's first return to the club that sacked him seven months earlier, Preston took the lead in first-half injury-time through Paul Huntington's header. Former Stevenage player, Scott Laird, then doubled the home side's advantage, before he provided the third goal late-on when he crossed the ball to Kevin Davies, who was on hand to slide the ball home from an acute angle. Stevenage then lost 3–1 at home to Carlisle United on 21 September. The away side took a one-goal lead into the break courtesy of a close range Lee Miller strike, before Stevenage responded through a Greg Tansey penalty after Luke Freeman had been fouled in the area. Carlisle retook the lead with just ten minutes remaining when Matty Robson fired home a left-footed shot, before David Amoo secured the win five minutes later following a late counterattack. Another heavy loss followed a week later, this time a 4–1 away defeat at the hands of Milton Keynes Dons. MK Dons were three goals to the good after just 23 minutes, before a Darren Potter own goal reduced the deficit just before the interval. There was to be no second-half comeback, and MK Dons restored their three-goal cushion with a Shaun Williams penalty on the hour mark. This meant that Stevenage had now conceded ten goals in their last three games.

October began with a fourth straight league defeat, a 1–0 home loss to Coventry City. The only goal of the game came after half-an-hour, with Leon Clarke latching onto Robin Shroot's misguided backpass to make no mistake from inside the area. Stevenage secured their first home league victory of the season in their following match, on 12 October, with a 2–1 win over Brentford. After trailing early-on from a close range Clayton Donaldson goal, Stevenage responded through two quickfire François Zoko goals. The first of which came when Zoko, making his league debut for the club, pounced on goalkeeper David Button's error to level, before the same man turned in the rebound after Jordan Burrow's initial shot had been saved. A week later, Stevenage narrowly lost away at Walsall, losing 2–1. François Zoko scored Stevenage's goal, a late consolation strike after Walsall had earned a commanding lead courtesy of goals either side of the half-time interval. Just three days later, on 22 October, Stevenage earned a convincing 3–0 away victory over Crewe Alexandra. All three goals came in the opening 20 minutes of the match. Filipe Morais opened the scoring when he latched onto François Zoko's knock down to finish calmly. Just two minutes later, Stevenage had doubled their advantage, this time through Luke Freeman's driven effort from a tight angle. Morais then scored his second of the match when he collected the ball outside the area and curled a shot past Steve Phillips in the Crewe goal. Stevenage secured back-to-back league wins for the first time in the season when they defeated Crawley Town 2–0 at Broadhall Way on 26 October. A powerful header from defender Peter Hartley gave the home side the lead after just eight minutes, before Michael Doughty doubled their advantage in injury-time with a left-footed shot that crept into the corner of the goal.

Source:

 Note: Stevenage goals come first.

League table

League Cup

First Round fixtures for the competition were released on 17 June 2013, with Stevenage being drawn at home to Championship opposition in the form of Ipswich Town. The match, played on 6 August, ended 2–0 in Stevenage's favour, the club's first competitive victory of the season. Both goals came in the second-half, the first coming from the penalty spot after Oumare Tounkara had been fouled in the area; with the resultant spot-kick being converting by Filipe Morais. Debutant Jordan Burrow doubled Stevenage's lead, sliding in from close range following good work from Robin Shroot and Simon Heslop down the right hand side. The victory meant Stevenage had progressed to the Second Round of the competition for only the second time in their history. Two days later, on 8 August, the draw for the next round was made, with the club being dealt their first ever away tie in the League Cup, facing Premier League side Everton at Goodison Park.

The club's tie against Everton took place on 28 August, narrowly falling to a 2–1 defeat after extra-time. Stevenage took the lead ten minutes before half-time when Luke Freeman was on hand to score from close range after the Everton defence had failed to clear Oumare Tounkara's cross. The Premier League outfit equalised in first-half injury-time when Gerard Deulofeu jinked his way into the box before calmly stroking the ball into the bottom corner of the goal. Both teams had chances to win the tie in normal time, but it was ultimately Marouane Fellaini who won it for Everton in extra-time, capitalising on a defensive mistake to score from six yards out.

 *Note: Stevenage goals come first.

FA Cup

 Note: Stevenage goals come first.

Football League Trophy

Stevenage were awarded a bye to the Second Round of the Football League Trophy. This is because the competition is split into Northern and Southern sections, with eight clubs in each section bypassing the First Round draw. The Second Round draw was made on 7 September 2013, with the club being drawn at home against fellow League One side Milton Keynes Dons. The match was played just over a month after the draw was made, on 8 October, with Stevenage securing a 2–1 victory courtesy of a second-half comeback. Milton Keynes had taken the lead midway through the first-half when Shaun Williams converted from the penalty spot. A debut goal from striker François Zoko restored parity in the match shortly after the interval, with the Ivorian poking in Michael Doughty's initial effort. Stevenage then turned the match on its head when Zoko's cross was handled in the area, with Filipe Morais scoring the subsequent spot-kick.

 Note: Stevenage goals come first.

Season statistics
Last updated on 22 October 2013.

Starts and goals

|-
!colspan="21"|Players who left the club before the end of the season
|-

|}

 Note: '+' denotes appearance as a substitute.
 Note: Herts Senior Cup games and statistics not included.

Transfers

In

Out

Loans in

Loans out

See also
2013–14 in English football
List of Stevenage F.C. seasons

References

External links
 Stevenage F.C. official website
 Stevenage F.C. on Soccerbase

Stevenage
Stevenage F.C. seasons